The Melbourne International Jazz Festival is an annual jazz music festival first held in Melbourne, Australia in 1998. The Festival takes place in concert halls, arts venues, jazz clubs and throughout the streets of Melbourne.

The 2021 Festival is scheduled to be held from 15–24 October, the 2020 Festival's physical events having been cancelled.

History
The Melbourne International Jazz Festival was first held in 1998. Adrian Jackson was the artistic director from 1998 until 2004; this run was interrupted in 2002, when the withdrawal of funding by Arts Victoria and the City of Melbourne in November 2001 meant that the program planned for January 2002 had to be canceled.

However much of the planned festival still went ahead, the City of Melbourne contacted Bennetts Lane Jazz Club founder Michael Tortoni to ask him if he was interested in taking control of the Festival. Tortoni agreed and effectively rescued the festival using his club's staff and infrastructure. Tortoni was appointed chairman in late 2001 and promptly restructured the board. Megan Evans and Jeremy Jankie, managers of Bennetts Lane Jazz Club, managed to present much of the 2002 festival and Evans went on to manage the festival the next year. Tortoni remained on the board serving in various roles.

Albert Dadon assumed the position of Chairman in 2004. He arranged for the long-running director of the Umbria Jazz Festival in Italy, Carlo Pagnotta, to be brought in as guest Artistic Director in 2005. The Festival went into recess in 2006, due to venue and scheduling issues arising from the Commonwealth Games held in Melbourne that year.

Dadon then took over as Artistic Director in 2007, and again for the 2008 festival. Dadon is founding chairman of the Australian Jazz Bell Awards.

Michael Tortoni has been the artistic director since 2009.

There was no festival in 2020, the physical event being cancelled due to the COVID-19 pandemic in Australia. In its place, on the last Saturday of May, June and July, the Festival presented the free 'These Digital Times', its first digital on-line live-streamed festival series.

The 2021 Festival is scheduled for 15–24 October 2021.

Artist lineups

Melbourne International Jazz Festival 2019 
Herbie Hancock, The Melbourne Symphony Orchestra with Troy Miller, Laura Mvula & Jose James, Billy Childs, Ms Lisa Fischer & Grand Baton, Ambrose Akinmusire with Origami Harvest, Ghost Note, the Vijay Iyer Trio, Petra Haden with Songs From My Father, Lonnie Holley, Vince Jones, Linda May Han Oh with Aventurine, Bill Frisell Trio, Rafiq Bhatia, Miles Okazaki with Work, Alma Zygier, Justine Clarke, Ross James Irwin with 60 Years of Kind of Blue: Reflections on a Miles Davis Masterpiece, Tamil Rogeon with MOMUS, Riffz2000, The Monash Art Ensemble, Josh Kelly with Displacement, Michael Pigneguy, Florian Hoefner, Jef Neve & Teus Nobel, Jamie Oehlers, Angela Davis Trio, The Rookies, Jazz Party, Horns of Leroy featuring Thando, Tanya George, YID!, Emma Donovan and the Putbacks, The Montgomery Brothers, Parvyn, ELio Villafranca, Marginal Consort, Stephen Magnusson Trio, Harriet Allcroft Quintet, Daniel Mougerman Quartet, Alexander Nettleback Quartet, James Sherlock Quartet, Peter Baylor's Ultrafox, Bopstretch, Julie O'Hara Quartet, Tony Gould Quartet, Jackie Bornstein Quartet, Sam Keevers Trio, Emma Gilmartin Quartet, Bob Sedergreen and Friends, Fem Belling, John Scurry's Reverse Swing Quartet, Paul Williamson Hammond Combo, The Concerteenies, Ajak Kwai, WVR BVBY, OJ Kush, The CB3, Tatafu, Lil Sumthin' Quintet, Kalyani & Isha, Claire Cross with Into Light, Phoebe Day, Soli Tesema, Elle Shimada.

Melbourne International Jazz Festival 2018 
Branford Marsalis, Maceo Parker, Sun Ra Arkestra, Terri Lyne Carrington and Social Science, Madeleine Peyroux, Christian McBride, Gretchen Parlato, Chris Davis & Drumhedz, Yemen Blues, Knower, Nubya Garcia, Barney McAll, The Public Opinion Afro Orchestra, The Others, Daniel Susnjar Afro-Peruvian Jazz Group, Steve Sedergreen's Points in Time, Novela, Francesco Cafiso, Harry James Angus, Tony Malaby with Kris Davis and Simon Barker, Breton Foster, The Gravity Project, The Rookies, Melbourne Gospel Choir, Kim Myhr & Peter Knight, the Australian Art Orchestra, Chok Kerong Trio, Roger Clarke Quartet, That's What I Like About You featuring Peter Hearne, Small Fish Big Pond, Dizzy's Big Band, Ben Charnley Quartet, James Mustafa Quartet, The Georgia Brooks Swingtet, Hot Club Swing, Prickly Pear, Margie Lou Dyer Quintet, Natasha Weatherill Quartet, The Emma Gilmartin Quartet, Jackie Bornstein Quartet, Julie O'Hara La Grande Soiree, The Andrea Keller Trio, Connie Lansberg featuring The Mark Fitzgibbon Trio, The Fem Belling Quartet, Bob Sedergreen and Friends, The Sam Keevers Trio featuring Michelle Nicole, The Paul Williamson Quartet, The Jamie Oehlers Quartet, New Flower Garden, Kalala & the Round Midnights, Duo Novo, DJ Chelsea Wilson, DJ Ennio Styles, Cool Out Sun, Thando, Stepping Into Tomorrow, GC O'Connor, Louise Goh's Tala Raga, Holly Moore Quartet.

Melbourne International Jazz Festival 2017 
A Celebration of Ella and Louis (Patti Austin and James Morrison), Bill Frisell: When You Wish Upon A Star, Carla Bley Trio, Dianne Reeves, Donny McCaslin Group, Kenny Barron Trio, The Necks, Cory Henry & The Funk Apostles, Swing City, Jobim's Masterpieces From Ipanema To The World, Brenton Foster 6tet, The Steve McQueens, Luke Howard Trio, Kira Kira, Tigran Hamasyan: An Ancient Observer, Out of Earshot, Appearing Nightly, Things that have been said (Hue Blanes), Bill Frisell Trio, Now. Here. This., BFK + Pascal Schumacher, Ari Hoenig Trio, Jim Black Quartet, Tal Cohen Quintet featuring Greg Osby, Yotam Silberstein Quartet, NAK Trio, MaxMantis, Moons of Jupiter (Paul Grabowsky), Still Night: Music in Poetry, Speedball, Late Night Jams with the Mark Fitzgibbon Trio, Bob Sedergreen and Friends, Margie Lou Dyer Quintet, James Sherlock Quartet, Jackie Bornstein Quartet, Emma Gilmartin Quartet, Ruth Rogers-Wright Quartet, Peter Baylor's "Ultrafox", Wilbur Wilde Quartet, Stephen Magnusson Trio, Jamie Oehlers Quartet, Scott Tinkler Standards Quartet, Sam Keevers Quartet, Andrea Keller Trio, Bopstretch, Carl Morgan Quartet, Dale Barlow Quartet, Hetty Kate Quintet, Dale Barlow Quintet, Julien Wilson Trio, Roger Clark Quintet with Sarah Maclaine, Dizzy's Big Band, Tribute to Blue Note, Warren Willis, Craig Schneider Trio, Unspoken Rule, Monash University Jazz Futures featuring Ari Hoenig Trio, Play School's Big Jazz Adventure, La Grande Soiree, Senegambian Jazz Band, Maria Moles & Adam Halliwell, Music Yared, Au Dre, Shio, Gospel Sundays, Audrey Powne Quartet, Lillian Albazi Quintet.

Melbourne International Jazz Festival 2012
McCoy Tyner Trio: McCoy Tyner, Gerald Cannon, Francisco Mela, Chris Potter, Jose James; Hiromi: The Trio Project: Hiromi, Anthony Jackson, Simon Phillips; Robert Hurst, Jamie Oehlers, Dave Beck; Terence Blanchard, Brice Winston, Fabian Almazan, Joshua Crumbly, Kendrick Scott; Rob Burke, Tony Gould, Nick Haywood, Tony Floyd; Dee Dee Bridgewater, Craig Handy, Edsel Gomez, Kenneth Davis, Johnathan Blake; Eli Degibri Quartet: Eli Degibri, Gadi Lehavi, Simon Starr, Aviv Cohen; Chris Potter & the Jazzgroove Mothership Orchestra: Chris Potter, Kristin Berardi, David Theak, Murray Jackson, Richard Maegraith, Matt Keegan, James Loughnan, Darryl Carthew, Phil Slater, Andy Fiddes, Simon Ferenci, Jeremy Borthwick, Dave Panichi, Danny Carmichael, Justin Kearin, Carl Morgan, Hugh Barrett, Brendan Clarke, Jamie Cameron; Future Now: Taylor McFerrin, Jose James, Takuya Kuroda, Kris Bowers, Solomon Dorsey, Nate Smith; Robert Glasper Experiment: Robert Glasper, Casey Benjamin, Derrick Hodge, Mark Colenberg, Patti Austin, Michael Ricchiuti, Evan Gregor, Ross Glen Pederson, Sally Mortenson, Annabelle Tunley, Rachael Head, Albare, Antonio Sanchez, Evri Evripedou, George Garzone, Hendrick Meurkens, Leo Genovese; Dr Lonnie Smith Trio: Dr Lonnie Smith, Jonathan Kreisberg, Jamire Williams; Renaud Garcia-Fons Arcoluz Trio: Renaud Garcia - Fons, Kiko Ruiz, Pascal Rollando, Luke Howard, Janos Bruneel; The Fringe: George Garzone, John Lockwood, Bob Gullotti; Jordan Murray's North East Collective: Jordan Murray, Tim Wilson, Geoff Hughes, Frank Di Sario, Ronny Ferella; Samuel Yirga Quartet: Samuel Yirga, Feleke Woldemariam, Yoseph Hailemariam Bekele, Nathaniel Zewde; Black Jesus Experience: Enushu Taye, Mr Monk, Peter Harper, Ian Dixon, Cassawarrior, Pat Kearney, Zhonu Nui aka Future Roots, Hue Blanes; Tarbaby featuring Oliver Lake: Oliver Lake, Orrin Evans, Eric Revis, Nasheet Waits; Paul Williamson Quartet: Paul Williamson, Marc Hannaford, Frank Di Sario, Antony Floyd; Another Place Some Other Time: Joe Chindamo, Nigel Maclean, Zoe Black, Alex Pertout, Phil Rex, Danny Farrugia; Three Lanes: Andrea Keller, Genevieve Lacey, Joe Talia; The Dough de Vries Trio present Baden Powell and the Afro-Sambas: Doug de Vries, Frank Di Sario, Alistair Kerr; Fish Boat of Fishing: Peter Knightm, Erik Griswold, Vanessa Tomlinson, Aviva Endean, Frank Di Sario, Joe Talia.

Melbourne International Jazz Festival 2011
Sonny Rollins, Sun Ra Arkestra, Ron Carter, Norma Winstone, Kurt Rosenwinkel, Lee Konitz, Chris Botti, The Raah Project, Jason Moran & The Bandwagon, Vijay Iyer, Rudresh Mahanthappa, Hypnotic Brass Ensemble, Charlemagne Palestine, Tony Conrad, Faust, James Morrison, Tex Perkins, Paris Wells, Eddie Perfect, Kimbra, Paul Grabowsky Trio, Julien Wilson, 3Cohens Sextet, Aaron Goldberg, AlasNoAxis, Chiri, Ari Hoenig, Jamie Oehlers, Scott Tinkler, Simon Barker, Tim Berne's Los Totopos, Satoko Fujii ma-do, Mary Halvorson Trio, Lisa Young 'The Eternal Pulse', MAGNET, Joe Chindamo Trio, Sarah McKenzie Quartet, Albare, Thymolphthalein, Shannon Barnett, Luke Moller, Sam Anning Quartet, Allan Browne Quartet featuring Bernie McGann, Bennetts Lane Big Band, Tim O'Dwyer Trio, Peter Knight's 5+2 Brass Ensemble + Quinsin Nachoff's Forward Motion, Kristin Berardi & James Sherlock Duo, Pascal Schumacher Quartet, Paul Williamson's Inside Out, James Muller Quartet, Mark Isaacs Resurgence Band, The Grid, Jelly Tub Rollers, Kid Life Crisis, Melbourne Youth Jazz Orchestra, The Shuffle Club, Motion, OPA!, WAAPA Jazz Ensemble, Whitesploitation, Monash University Stage Band, Monash University World Orchestra, OK OK OK.

Overground Festival 2011
Oren Ambarchi/Charlemagne Palestine, Yoshida Tatsuya/Satoko Fujii, Zond/Nick Tammens/Marco Fusinato, Jim Denley/xNOBBQx, Scott Tinkler/Oscar Noriega/James Rushford, Yoshida Tatsuya/Troy Naumoff/Ren Walters, Joe Talia/Brian Ritchie/Mary Halvorson/Rosalind Hall, Blank Realm/Andrew Tuttle, Will Guthrie/Cured Pink, Tim Berne/Anthony Pateras/Gareth Thompson, Jim Denley/Alex Garsden/Natasha Anderson/Ches Smith, Shags Chamberlain/Laurence Pike/Jean-Hervé Péron, Yoshida Tatsuya/Clayton Thomas/Lloyd Honeybrook/Angus Leslie, Skyneedle/Snawklor, Nekrasov, Chris Abrahams/Tim O’Dwyer/Sophia Brous/Judith Hamann, Snake Oil/Tim Berne/Matt Mitchell/Ches Smith, Will Guthrie/Lucas Abela/Emma Albury, Rully Shabara/Wukir Suryadi, Golden Fur/Satoko Fujii/Darren Moore, Fabulous Diamonds/Naked on the Vague, Matt Mitchell, Sean Baxter/Jerome Noetinger/Faust, Tony Conrad/Chris Abrahams.
Roamers and Installation artists -  Kusum Normoyle, Hi God People, Keptis, Rod Cooper, Vijay Thillaimuthu, Bum Creek, Public Assembly/Anthony Magen, Troy Naumoff, Ren Walters, Clinton Green, Radio Cegeste, Fabio Umbert.

Melbourne International Jazz Festival 2010
Charles Lloyd, John Abercrombie, Zakir Hussain, Ahmad Jamal, Mulatu Astatke, Peter Brötzmann, Avishai Cohen, John Hollenbeck, Theo Bleckmann, Paul Grabowsky, Jazzgroove Mothership Orchestra, Jamie Ohlers, Mike Nock, Jo Lowry, Stu Hunter, Flap!, Paul Capsis, Joe Chindamo Trio, Clare Bowditch, Lior, Whitley and Megan Washington.

Overground Festival 2010
Han Bennink/Peter Brötzmann, Pure Evil Trio/Occult Blood, Greg Kingston/Tarquin Manek, Kim Myhr/Dale Gorfinkel/Cor Fuhler, Brian Chase/Seth Misterka, Kim Salmon/David Brown (Australian musician), Carolyn Connors, Golden Fur/True Radical Miracle, The Deadnotes, Anthony Pateras/Han Bennink, Vanessa Tomlinson/Eugene Ughetti/Robin Fox, Carolyn Connors/Nik Kennedy/Sophie Brous/Pete Hyde/Jessica Aszodi/Alex Vivian/Christopher L. G. Hill/Tarquin Manek/Shane Van Den Akker, Dirk De Bruyn/Joel Stern, Showa 44, Oren Ambarchi/Marco Fusinato/Brian Chase, Simon Barker/Bum Creek/Snawklor, Cor Fuhler/Scott Tinkler, Paul Grabowsky/Sean Baxter, Mick Turner/Francis Plagne/Erkki Veltheim/Evelyn Morris, Embers Big Band featuring Peter Brötzmann/Kris Wanders/Adam Simmons/Abel Cross/Greg Kingston/David Brown/Han Bennink/KRAM (Mark Maher)/Sean Baxter

Melbourne International Jazz Festival 2009
Actis Dato Quartet, Adam Simmons, Allan Browne/ Sam Anning/ Marc Hannaford trio, Andrea Keller, Bill Frisell, Bum Creek, Carl Riseley, Charlie Haden, Charlie Haden/ Bill Frisell/ Ethan Iverson trio, Choir of Hard Knocks, Ethan Iverson, FGHR, Flap!, Harry James Angus, Jazzgroove Mothership orchestra with Bert Joris, Jim Black, Joshua Redman trio, Judy Carmichael, Julien Wilson quintet with Jim Black, Kate Ceberano, Katie Noonan Blackbird Project, Kristin Berardi band featuring James Muller, Laughing Clowns, Marc Hannaford, Magnusson / Ball / Talia trio, Melbourne Symphony orchestra, Monash University jazz ensemble, Nels Cline, Oren Ambarchi and Nels Cline duo, Nels Cline/ Tim Berne/ Jim Black trio, Pateras Baxter Brown, Paul Grabowsky, The Hoodangers, The Mell-O-Tones, The Vampires, Tim Berne, VCA jazz ensemble, Virus, and Zac Hurren trio.

Melbourne International Jazz Festival 2008
Aaron Choulai, Allan Browne Quintet, Bob Sedergreen, Cindy Blackman Quartet, Dr. Abdullah Ibrahim, James Morrison, Jazz à Juan Révélations All Stars, Joe Chindamo, Jon Weber, Kate Ceberano, Kurt Elling, Les Enfants de Django, Lisa Young Quartet, Lost and Found: Oehlers Grabowsky and Beck, Michelle Nicole Octet, Monash University Big Band, Monash University World Music Orchestra, Moovin' and Groovin' Orchestra, Nancy Wilson and her Trio, Sam Keevers Trio featuring Gian Slater, San Lazaro, Slava Grigoryan and Leonard Grigoryan, Tomasz Stańko Quartet, Tord Gustavsen Trio, Yamandu Costa Trio, YUL LULL: VCA Music Indigenous Ensemble, and Yvette Johansson.

Melbourne International Jazz Festival 2007
Chick Corea, Herbie Hancock, Gary Burton, Frank Gambale, Jens Winther Quintet, Pharoah Sanders, McCoy Tyner Trio, Dave Liebman, Kate Ceberano, Yvette Johansson and the Moovin' & Groovin' Orchestra, James Morrison Quintet, Jamie Oehlers Small World Ensemble, The Las Vegas Mass Choir, Elana Stone, Yamandu Costa Trio, Janet Seidel Quintet, Joe Chindamo Trio, Graeme Lyall, Doug de Vries, Matt Jodrell, Kim Cheol Woong, John Weber, Chris McNulty, Paul Bollenback, Mike Nock, Abatte Barihun, Ken Schroder, David Allardice, Bob Sedergreen, Tony Gould, Paul Grabowsky, Evripides Evripidou, Jeff Duff Quartet, Julie O'Hara Quintet, Albert Beger, Oderquis Revé, Afro Timba, Kenny Lopéz, Pablo Discobar, VCA & Monash University Students, Cycling Katrina.

Artist Lineups 1998-2004 
International artists included Gary Bartz, James 'Blood' Ulmer, Ralph Sutton, Brad Mehldau Trio, Chris Potter, Bobby Previte's Bitches Brew Project, Pierre Dorge's New Jungle Orchestra, Norman Simmons, Andy Bey, Branford Marsalis Quartet, Alexi Tuomarila Quartet, Mark Murphy, Matt Wilson Quartet, Raw Materials, Chick Corea & Gary Burton, Barbara Morrison, Ricky Ford, Yuri Honing Trio, Jim Cullum, Niels-Henning Ørsted Pedersen, Tim Ries, Pascal Schumacher Quartet, Quinsin Nachoff, Hugh Fraser Quintet.

Australian artists included Graeme Bell, Bernie McGann, Paul Grabowsky, Australian Art Orchestra, Don Burrows, Dale Barlow, Bob Barnard, Peter Gaudion, Tom Baker, Society Syncopators, Ted Vining Trio, Ten Part Invention, The Engine Room, Mike Nock, Cathy Harley Quintet, bucketrider big band, Jamie Oehlers, James Morrison, Joe Chindamo, Theaktet, James Muller, The Necks, Fiona Burnett, Allan Browne, Steve Hunter's Nine Lives, Aron Ottignon, David Tolley, Roger Bell, Vince Jones, SNAG, Jex Saarelaht, Ian Chaplin, Keith Hounslow, The Hoodangers, Shelley Scown, Judy Jacques, Yarra Yarra Jazz Band, John Gill, Danny Moss, The Catholics, The Cat Empire, Nina Ferro, Aaron Choulai, David Jones, Dick & Christa Hughes, Erik Griswold, Dave MacRae & Joy Yates, Michelle Nicolle, Doug DeVries, Bob Sedergreen, Brian Brown, Band of Five Names, Niko Schauble, Andrea Keller, Scott Tinkler and Rob Burke.

Venues 
Bennetts Lane Jazz Club
Melbourne Town Hall
Arts Centre Melbourne
Melbourne Recital Centre
The Jazzlab
170 Russell
Australian Centre for the Moving Image
Federation Square
Bluestone Church Arts Space
Chunky Move
Clocktower Centre
Darebin Arts & Entertainment Centre
Deluxe Bar & Lounge
District North
Dizzy's Jazz Club
Kindred Studios
Lido Jazz Room
Mango Lounge Bar
Monash University Music Auditorium
The Toff in Town
The Reverence Hotel 
The White House
St James
Uptown Jazz Cafe
VU at MetroWest

References

External links

Melbourne Jazz Official Website
Melbourne Jazz Official Myspace

Jazz festivals in Australia
Music festivals in Melbourne
1998 establishments in Australia
Performing arts in Melbourne